Tamluk Lok Sabha constituency is one of the 543 parliamentary constituencies in India. All seven assembly segments under Tamluk Lok Sabha constituency are in Purba Medinipur district.

Vidhan Sabha segments

As per order of the Delimitation Commission issued in 2006 in respect of the delimitation of constituencies in the West Bengal, parliamentary constituency no. 30 Tamluk is  composed of the following segments:

Prior to delimitation Tamluk Lok Sabha constituency was composed of the following assembly segments: Panskura East (assembly constituency no. 201), Tamluk (assembly constituency no. 202), Moyna (assembly constituency no. 203), Mahisadal (assembly constituency no. 204), Sutahata (SC) (assembly constituency no. 205),  Nandigram (assembly constituency no. 206) and Narghat (assembly constituency no. 207).

Members of Lok Sabha

Election results

General election 2019

2016 by-election

General election 2014

General election 2009

General election 2004

General election 1999

General election 1998

General election 1996

General elections 1951-2004
Most of the contests were multi-cornered. However, only winners and runners-up are mentioned below:

References

See also
 List of Constituencies of the Lok Sabha

Lok Sabha constituencies in West Bengal
Politics of Purba Medinipur district